Indian Idol is the Indian music competition television franchise based on the Pop Idol format. 

Its production takes place in Mumbai, Maharashtra.

Versions 

  Currently airing – 2
  Upcoming for airing – 0
  Recently concluded – 1
  No longer airing – 1

References 

 
Television series by Fremantle (company)
Indian television series based on British television series